Gymnoclytia occidentalis is a North American species of tachinid flies in the genus Gymnoclytia of the family Tachinidae.

Distribution
British Columbia, Idaho, California, Utah, Colorado, New Mexico and Washington

References

External links
 Taxonomic & Host Catalogue of the Tachinidae of America North of Mexico

Phasiinae
Diptera of North America
Insects described in 1908